The Amu Darya (also called the Amu, Amo River, and historically known by its Latin name  or Greek ) is a major river in Central Asia and Afghanistan. Rising in the Pamir Mountains, north of the Hindu Kush, the Amu Darya is formed by the confluence of the Vakhsh and Panj rivers, in the Tigrovaya Balka Nature Reserve on the border between Afghanistan and Tajikistan, and flows from there north-westwards into the southern remnants of the Aral Sea. In its upper course, the river forms part of Afghanistan's northern border with Tajikistan, Uzbekistan, and Turkmenistan. In ancient history, the river was regarded as the boundary of Greater Iran with "Turan", which roughly corresponded to present-day Central Asia. The Amu Darya has a flow of about 70 cubic kilometres per year on average.

Names

The Avestan texts too refer to the River as Yakhsha/Vakhsha (and Yakhsha Arta ("upper Yakhsha") referring to the Jaxartes/Syr Darya twin river to Amu Darya). 'good river'). 

The name Amu is said to have come from the medieval city of Āmul, (later, Chahar Joy/Charjunow, and now known as Türkmenabat), in modern Turkmenistan, with Darya being the Persian word for "lake". Medieval Arabic and Islamic sources call the river Jayhoun (also Jaihun, Jayhoon, or Dzhaykhun) which is derived from Gihon, the biblical name for one of the four rivers of the Garden of Eden. River Amu Darya passes through one of the world's highest deserts.

As the river Gozan
Western travelers in the 19th century mentioned that one of the names by which the river was known in Afghanistan was Gozan, and that this name was used by Greek, Mongol, Chinese, Persian, Jewish, and Afghan historians. However, this name is no longer used.

"Hara (Bokhara) and to the river of Gozan (that is to say, the Amu, (called the Oxus by Europeans )) ..."

"the Gozan River is the River Balkh, i.e. the Oxus or the Amu Darya ..."

"... and were brought into Halah (modern day Balkh), and Habor (which is Pesh Habor or Peshawar), and Hara (which is Herat), and to the river Gozan (which is the Ammoo, also called Jehoon) ..."

Description

Even before large-scale irrigation began, high summer evaporation meant that not all of this discharge reached the Aral Sea – though there is some evidence the large Pamir glaciers provided enough meltwater for the Aral to overflow during the 13th and 14th centuries.

Since the end of the 19th century there have been four different claimants as the true source of the Oxus:
 The Pamir River, which emerges from Lake Zorkul (once also known as Lake Victoria) in the Pamir Mountains (ancient Mount Imeon), and flows west to Qila-e Panja, where it joins the Wakhan River to form the Panj River.
 The Sarhad or Little Pamir River flowing down the Little Pamir in the High Wakhan
 Lake Chamaktin, which discharges to the east into the Aksu River, which in turn becomes the Murghab and then Bartang rivers, and which eventually joins the Panj Oxus branch 350 kilometres downstream at Roshan Vomar in Tajikistan.
 An ice cave at the end of the Wakhjir valley, in the Wakhan Corridor, in the Pamir Mountains, near the border with Pakistan.

Bill Colegrave's expedition to Wakhan in 2007 found that both claimants 2 and 3 had the same source, the Chelab stream, which bifurcates on the watershed of the Little Pamir, half flowing into Lake Chamaktin and half into the parent stream of the Little Pamir/Sarhad River. Therefore, the Chelab stream may be properly considered the true source or parent stream of the Oxus. The Panj River forms the border of Afghanistan and Tajikistan. It flows west to Ishkashim where it turns north and then north-west through the Pamirs passing the Tajikistan–Afghanistan Friendship Bridge. It delineates the border of Afghanistan and Turkmenistan for another  before it flows into Turkmenistan at Atamurat. It flows across Turkmenistan south to north, passing Türkmenabat, and forms the border of Turkmenistan and Uzbekistan from Halkabat. It is then split by the Tuyamuyun Hydro Complex into many waterways that used to form the river delta joining the Aral Sea, passing Urgench, Daşoguz, and other cities, but it does not reach what is left of the sea any more and is lost in the desert. Use of water from the Amu Darya for irrigation has been a major contributing factor to the shrinking of the Aral Sea since the late 1950s. Historical records state that in different periods, the river flowed into the Aral Sea (from the south), into the Caspian Sea (from the east), or both, similar to the Syr Darya (Jaxartes, in Ancient Greek).

Watershed

The  of the Amu Darya drainage basin include most of Tajikistan, the southwest corner of Kyrgyzstan, the northeast corner of Afghanistan, a narrow portion of eastern Turkmenistan and the western half of Uzbekistan. Part of the Amu Darya basin divide in Tajikistan forms that country's border with China (in the east) and Pakistan (to the south). About 61% of the drainage lies within Tajikistan, Uzbekistan and Turkmenistan, while 39% is in Afghanistan.

The abundant water flowing in the Amu Darya comes almost entirely from glaciers in the Pamir Mountains and Tian Shan,
which, standing above the surrounding arid plain, collect atmospheric moisture which otherwise would probably escape somewhere else. Without its mountain water sources, the Amu Darya would not exist—because it rarely rains in the lowlands through which most of the river flows. Of the total drainage area only about  actively contribute water to the river.
This is because many of the river's major tributaries (especially the Zeravshan River) have been diverted, and much of the river's drainage is arid.

History

The ancient Greeks called the Amu Darya the Oxus. In ancient times, the river was regarded as the boundary between Greater Iran and Ṫūrān. The river's drainage lies in the area between the former empires of Genghis Khan and Alexander the Great, although they occurred at very different times. When the Mongols came to the area, they used the water of the Amu Darya to flood Konye-Urgench. One southern route of the Silk Road ran along part of the Amu Darya northwestward from Termez before going westwards to the Caspian Sea.

It is believed that the Amu Darya's course across the Karakum Desert has gone through several major shifts in the past few thousand years. Much of the time – most recently from the 13th century to the late 16th century – the Amu Darya emptied into both the Aral and the Caspian Seas, reaching the latter via a large distributary called the Uzboy River. The Uzboy splits off from the main channel just south of the river's delta. Sometimes the flow through the two branches was more or less equal, but often most of the Amu Darya's flow split to the west and flowed into the Caspian.

People began to settle along the lower Amu Darya and the Uzboy in the 5th century, establishing a thriving chain of agricultural lands, towns, and cities. In about AD 985, the massive Gurganj Dam at the bifurcation of the forks started to divert water to the Aral. Genghis Khan's troops destroyed the dam in 1221, and the Amu Darya shifted to distributing its flow more or less equally between the main stem and the Uzboy. But in the 18th century, the river again turned north, flowing into the Aral Sea, a path it has taken since. Less and less water flowed down the Uzboy. When Russian explorer Bekovich-Cherkasski surveyed the region in 1720, the Amu Darya did not flow into the Caspian Sea anymore.

By the 1800s, the ethnographic makeup of the region was described by Peter Kropotkin as the communities of "the vassal Khanates of Maimene, Khulm, Kunduz, and even the Badakshan and Wahkran." An Englishman, William Moorcroft, visited the Oxus around 1824 during the Great Game period. Another Englishman, a naval officer called John Wood, came with an expedition to find the source of the river in 1839. He found modern-day Lake Zorkul, called it Lake Victoria, and proclaimed he had found the source. Then, the French explorer and geographer Thibaut Viné collected a lot of information about this area during five expeditions between 1856 and 1862.

The question of finding a route between the Oxus valley and India has been of concern historically. A direct route crosses extremely high mountain passes in the Hindu Kush and isolated areas like Kafiristan. Some in Britain feared that the Empire of Russia, which at the time wielded great influence over the Oxus area, would overcome these obstacles and find a suitable route through which to invade British India – but this never came to pass. The area was taken over by Russia during the Russian conquest of Turkestan.

The Soviet Union became the ruling power in the early 1920s and expelled Mohammed Alim Khan. It later put down the Basmachi movement and killed Ibrahim Bek. A large refugee population of Central Asians, including Turkmen, Tajiks and Uzbeks, fled to northern Afghanistan. In the 1960s and 1970s the Soviets started using the Amu Darya and the Syr Darya to irrigate extensive cotton fields in the Central Asian plain. Before this time, water from the rivers was already being used for agriculture, but not on this massive scale. The Qaraqum Canal, Karshi Canal, and Bukhara Canal were among the larger of the irrigation diversions built. However, the Main Turkmen Canal, which would have diverted water along the dry Uzboy River bed into central Turkmenistan, was never built. The 1970s, in the course of the Soviet–Afghan War, Soviet forces used the valley to invade Afghanistan through Termez. The Soviet Union fell in the 1990s and Central Asia split up into the many smaller countries that lie within or partially within the Amu Darya basin.

During the Soviet era, a resource-sharing system was instated in which Kyrgyzstan and Tajikistan shared water originating from the Amu and Syr Daryas with Kazakhstan, Turkmenistan, and Uzbekistan in summer. In return, Kyrgyzstan and Tajikistan received Kazakh, Turkmen, and Uzbek coal, gas, and electricity in winter. After the fall of the Soviet Union this system disintegrated and the Central Asian nations have failed to reinstate it. Inadequate infrastructure, poor water-management, and outdated irrigation methods all exacerbate the issue.

Siberian Tiger Introduction Project

The Caspian tiger used to occur along the river's banks. After its extirpation, the Darya's delta was suggested as a potential site for the introduction of its closest surviving relative, the Siberian tiger. A feasibility study was initiated to investigate if the area is suitable and if such an initiative would receive support from relevant decision makers. A viable tiger population of about 100 animals would require at least  of large tracts of contiguous habitat with rich prey populations. Such habitat is not available at this stage and cannot be provided in the short term. The proposed region is therefore unsuitable for the reintroduction, at least at this stage.

Resource extraction
In January 2023 the Xinjiang Central Asia Petroleum and Gas Company (aka CAPEIC) signed a $720 million four-year investment deal with the Taliban government of Afghanistan for extraction on its side of the Amu Darya basin. The deal will see a 15% royalty given to the Afghan government over the course of its 25-year term. The Chinese see this basin as the third-largest potential gas field in the world.

Literature

The Oxus river, and Arnold's poem, fire the imaginations of the children who adventure with ponies over the moors of the West Country in the 1930s children's book The Far-Distant Oxus. There were two sequels, Escape to Persia and Oxus in Summer.

Robert Byron's 1937 travelogue, The Road to Oxiana, describes its author's journey from the Levant through Persia to Afghanistan, with the Oxus as his stated goal.

George MacDonald Fraser's Flashman at the Charge, (1973), places Flashman on the Amu Darya and the Aral Sea during the (fictitious) Russian advance on India during The Great Game period.

See also
 Oxus Treasure
 Vankhsh River
 Mount Imeon
 Sherabad River
 Surkhan Darya
 Transoxiana
 Zeravshan River
 Extreme points of Afghanistan
 List of rivers of Afghanistan

Notes

References

Further reading
 Curzon, George Nathaniel. 1896. The Pamirs and the Source of the Oxus. Royal Geographical Society, London. Reprint: Elibron Classics Series, Adamant Media Corporation. 2005.  (pbk;  (hbk).
 Gordon, T. E. 1876. The Roof of the World: Being the Narrative of a Journey over the high plateau of Tibet to the Russian Frontier and the Oxus sources on Pamir. Edinburgh. Edmonston and Douglas. Reprint by Ch'eng Wen Publishing Company. Taipei. 1971.
 Toynbee, Arnold J. 1961. Between Oxus and Jumna. London. Oxford University Press.
 Wood, John, 1872. A Journey to the Source of the River Oxus. With an essay on the Geography of the Valley of the Oxus by Colonel Henry Yule. London: John Murray.

External links

 
 The Amu Darya Basin Network

Rivers of Afghanistan
Rivers of Tajikistan
Rivers of Turkmenistan
Rivers of Uzbekistan
International rivers of Asia
Afghanistan–Turkmenistan border
Afghanistan–Tajikistan border
Afghanistan–Uzbekistan border
Turkmenistan–Uzbekistan border
Border rivers
Landforms of Badakhshan Province
Siberian Tiger Re-population Project
Rivers in Buddhism